PSD may refer to:

Educational bodies
 Pennsylvania School for the Deaf, a Pre-K to 12th grade school for Deaf and Hard of Hearing students, located in the Germantown section of Philadelphia, Pennsylvania
 Philippine School Doha, a Filipino school in Doha, Qatar
 Pontiac School District, a school district in Michigan, US
 Poudre School District, a school district in Larimer County, Colorado

Government and military
 Payment Services Directive, EU regulation for payment services
 Pesticides Safety Directorate, UK
 Presidential Study Directive, a kind of national security directive from the Obama presidency
 Prevention of Significant Deterioration (PSD) permit, under the Clean Air Act (United States)
 Protective Services Detail, Personal Security Detachment, or Personal Security Detail; US military security details

Language
 Pennsylvania Sumerian Dictionary, lexicography project for the ancient language isolate 
 Plains Indian Sign Language (ISO 639-3 code: psd)
 Proto-South Dravidian, unattested language of south India

Political parties

Africa
 Social Democratic Party (Angola), a political party of Angola
 Social Democratic Party (Benin), a political party of Benin
 Social Democratic Party of Madagascar, a political party of Madagascar
 Social Democratic Party (Rwanda), a political party of Rwanda
 Socialist Destourian Party, former name (to 1988) of the ruling party in Tunisia, currently called Constitutional Democratic Rally

Americas
 Parti social démocratique du Québec, a former provincial political party in Canada
 Democratic Socialist Party (Argentina), a defunct political party of Argentina
 Social Democratic Party (Brazil, 1945–65), a defunct political party of Brazil
 Social Democratic Party (Brazil, 2011), a current political party of Brazil
 Social Democratic Party (El Salvador), a political party of El Salvador
 Social Democratic Party (Mexico), a defunct political party of Mexico
 Social Democratic Party (Nicaragua), a political party of Nicaragua

Europe
 Civil Movement "People's Self-Defense", a defunct political movement in Ukraine which was part of the Our Ukraine–People's Self-Defense Bloc electoral alliance
 Party of Socialists and Democrats, a major political party of San Marino
 Social Democratic Party of Albania, a minor political party of Albania
 Social Democratic Party (France), a defunct political party of France
 Social Democratic Party (Moldova), a political party of Moldova
 Social Democratic Party (Portugal), a major political party of Portugal
 Social Democratic Party (Romania), a major political party of Romania
 Social Democratic Party (Spain), a defunct political party of Spain

Science and engineering

Computing
 Personal or portable storage device
 .psd, a Photoshop document file extension
 Professional Scrum Developer, a course leading to certification for Scrum (development)
 Power spectral density, the distribution of power per unit time into frequency components composing that signal.

Medicine
 Protein S deficiency
 Post-stroke depression
 Postsynaptic density, a specialization of the cytoskeleton at the synaptic junction
 Psychiatric service dog

Other uses in science and engineering
 Particle size distribution, in granular materials
 Platform screen doors, on railway platforms
 Position sensitive device or detector, a two-dimensional photodetector
 Positive semidefinite (disambiguation)
 Power spectral density, distribution of power of a signal
 Program Service Data, data displayed on HD radio receiver

Other uses
 PSD (rapper), a Californian rapper and hip-hop producer
 Port Said Airport, Egypt (IATA code PSD)
 Private Sector Development, term used in international development
 PSD Bank, German banking group